Marcel François Marie Joseph Lefebvre  (29 November 1905 – 25 March 1991) was a French Catholic archbishop who greatly influenced modern traditional Catholicism. In 1970, he founded the Society of Saint Pius X (SSPX), a community to train seminarians, in the village of Écône, Switzerland. In 1988, he was excommunicated from the Catholic Church for consecrating four bishops against the express prohibition  of Pope John Paul II.

Ordained a diocesan priest in 1929, he had joined the Holy Ghost Fathers for missionary work and was assigned to teach at a seminary in Gabon in 1932. In 1947, he was appointed Vicar Apostolic of Dakar, Senegal, and the next year as the Apostolic Delegate for West Africa. Upon his return to Europe he was elected Superior General of the Holy Ghost Fathers and assigned to participate in the drafting and preparation of documents for the upcoming Second Vatican Council (1962–1965) announced by Pope John XXIII. He was a major leader of the conservative bloc during its proceedings. He later took the lead in opposing certain changes within the church associated with the council. He refused to implement council-inspired reforms demanded by the Holy Ghost Fathers and resigned from its leadership in 1968. In 1970, he founded the Society of Saint Pius X (SSPX) as a small community of seminarians in the village of Écône, Switzerland, with the permission of the local bishop.

In 1975, after a flare of tensions with the Holy See, Lefebvre was ordered to disband the society, but ignored the decision and continued to maintain its activities and existence. In 1988, against the express prohibition of Pope John Paul II, he consecrated four bishops to continue his work with the SSPX. The Holy See immediately declared that he and the other bishops who had participated in the ceremony had incurred automatic excommunication under Catholic canon law, which Lefebvre refused to acknowledge.

Early life and family 

Marcel Lefebvre was born in Tourcoing, Nord. He was the second son and third child of eight children of textile factory-owner René Lefebvre and Gabrielle, born Watine, who died in 1938.

His parents were devout Catholics who brought their children to daily Mass. His father, René, was an outspoken monarchist, devoting his life to the cause of the French Dynasty, seeing in a monarchy the only way of restoring to his country its past grandeur and a Christian revival.

His father ran a spy-ring for British Intelligence when Tourcoing was occupied by the Germans during World War I. René died at age 65 in 1944.

Priest 

In 1923 Lefebvre began studies for the priesthood; at the insistence of his father he followed his brother to the French Seminary in Rome, as his father suspected the diocesan seminaries of liberal leanings. He later credited his conservative views to the rector, a Breton priest named Father Henri Le Floch. He interrupted his studies in 1926 and 1927 to perform his military service. On 25 May 1929 he was ordained deacon by Cardinal Basilio Pompili in the Basilica of St. John Lateran in Rome. On 21 September 1929 he was ordained a priest of Diocese of Lille by its bishop, Achille Liénart. After ordination, he continued his studies in Rome, completing a doctorate in theology in July 1930.

Lefebvre asked to be allowed to perform missionary work as a member of the Holy Ghost Fathers, but in August 1930 Liénart required him to first work as assistant curate in a parish in Lomme, a suburb of Lille. Liénart released him from the diocese in July 1931 and Lefebvre entered the novitiate of the Holy Ghost Fathers at Orly in September. On 8 September 1932, he took simple vows for a period of three years.

Lefebvre's first assignment as a Holy Ghost Father was as a professor at St. John's Seminary in Libreville, Gabon. In 1934 he was made rector of the seminary. On 28 September 1935 he made his perpetual vows. He served as superior of a number of missions of the Holy Ghost Fathers in Gabon. In October 1945 Lefebvre returned to France to become rector of the Holy Ghost Fathers seminary in Mortain.

Bishop in Africa 
On 12 June 1947, Pope Pius XII appointed him Vicar Apostolic of Dakar in Senegal and titular bishop of Anthedon. On 18 September 1947 he was consecrated a bishop in his family's parish church in Tourcoing by Liénart, now a cardinal, with Bishops Jean-Baptiste Fauret and Alfred-Jean-Félix Ancel as co-consecrators. In his new position Lefebvre was responsible for an area with a population of three and a half million people, of whom only 50,000 were Catholics.

On 22 September 1948, Lefebvre, while continuing as Vicar Apostolic of Dakar, received the additional responsibilities of Apostolic Delegate to French Africa, with his title changed to titular archbishop of Arcadiopolis in Europa. He became responsible for representing the interests of the Holy See to Church authorities in 46 dioceses in "continental and insular Africa subject to the French Government, with the addition of the Diocese of Reunion, the whole of the island of Madagascar and the other neighbouring islands under French rule, but excluding the dioceses of North Africa, namely those of Carthage, Constantine, Algiers and Oran."

In the late 1940s, Lefebvre established a ministry in Paris to care for Catholic students from the French colonies in Africa. He and other missionaries in Africa thought young Africans would otherwise be attracted to radical ideologies, including anti-colonialism and atheism. This idea of "safeguarding the Catholicism of the emerging African elite" was later adopted by Pope Pius in his encyclical on the missions, Fidei donum (1957).

Lefebvre's chief duty was the building up of the ecclesiastical structure in French Africa. Pope Pius XII wanted to move quickly towards an ecclesiastical structure with dioceses instead of vicariates and apostolic prefectures. Lefebvre was responsible for selecting these new bishops, increasing the number of priests and religious sisters, as well as the number of churches in the various dioceses. On 14 September 1955, Pope Pius decreed a complete reorganization of the ecclesiastical jurisdictions in French Africa. The Apostolic Vicariate of Dakar was made an archdiocese and Lefebvre became its first archbishop.

Transition years, 1959–1962 
Lefebvre's career shifted rapidly with the death of Pope Pius XII, moving from the missions to Rome, though not directly, and with indications he was at times favored and at times disfavored by the new pope. Pope John XXIII replaced Lefebvre as Apostolic Delegate to Dakar on 9 July 1959, a position that would quickly evolve as the colonies gained their independence in the 1960s. The next year, Pope John appointed Lefebvre to the 120-member Central Preparatory Commission for the Second Vatican Council.

After Senegal declared its independence in June 1960, its first president, Léopold Sédar Senghor proposed the country adopt its own form of socialism, which he as a Catholic believed compatible with Church doctrine. Lefebvre, still Archbishop of Dakar, criticized Senghor's views in a March 1961 pastoral letter and then in a personal audience with Senghor, drawing on Pope Pius XI's denunciation of socialism in his 1931 encyclical Quadragesimo anno. Now at odds with the government, Lefebvre watched as the Holy See replaced European missionary bishops with Africans and tried to delay his own removal by asking for the appointment of a coadjutor, which met with no response. He told Pope John "the Africans are not yet ripe" and did not want to be responsible. Pope John said he took the responsibility and would see Lefebvre was taken care of properly.

On 23 January 1962, Lefebvre was transferred to the Diocese of Tulle, one of the smallest in France, while retaining the personal title of archbishop.
On 4 April 1962, he was named a consultor to the Sacred Congregation for the Propagation of the Faith.

On 26 July 1962, the Chapter General of the Holy Ghost Fathers, dominated by those in leadership positions with fewer representatives of local communities, elected Lefebvre to a 12-year term as their Superior General. He won 53 of the 75 votes cast on the first ballot, though some delegates had "strong misgivings". This meeting also moved the order's headquarters from Paris to Rome. Upon being elected Superior General, Lefebvre resigned as bishop of Tulle; Pope John accepted his resignation on 7 August and named him titular archbishop of Synnada in Phrygia.

Second Vatican Council 
As a member of the Central Preparatory Commission Lefebvre participated in drafting documents for consideration by the Council Fathers, meeting in seven sessions between June 1961 and June 1962. Within the first two weeks of the first session of the council (October to December 1962) the Council Fathers rejected all the drafts.

Lefebvre and some like-minded bishops became concerned about the direction of the council's deliberations and, led by Archbishop Geraldo de Proença Sigaud of Diamantina, formed a bloc that became known as the Coetus Internationalis Patrum (CIP) or International Group of Fathers, with the aim of guaranteeing their views were part of every council discussion.

The CIP was especially concerned about the principle of religious liberty. During the council's third session (September to November 1964), Archbishop Pericle Felici, the secretary of the council and a prominent Curial conservative, announced that Lefebvre, with two other like-minded bishops, was appointed to a special four-member commission charged with rewriting the draft document on the topic, but it was soon discovered that this measure did not have papal approval, and major responsibility for preparing the draft document was given to the Secretariat for Promoting Christian Unity.

The CIP managed to get the preliminary vote (with suggestions for modifications) on the document postponed until the fourth session of the council, where, on 7 December 1965, an overwhelming majority approved the final text of the declaration Dignitatis humanae. Lefebvre was one of the 70, about 3%, who voted against the declaration, but he added his signature to the document after that of the pope, though some withheld their signatures.

The Council and the Holy Ghost Fathers 
At one point during the Council, some 40 bishops who were members of the Holy Ghost Fathers met with him to express their disagreement with his views and the role he was playing at the Council. He heard their views but did not engage in dialogue. His closing statement, "We all have a conscience: everyone must follow his own.", left them dissatisfied. One said: "He seemed to have a blockage. He seemed incapable of reviewing his ways of thinking."

Lefebvre felt the Council's impact directly when the Holy Ghost Fathers held an Extraordinary General Chapter to respond to it. The order's leadership, though their terms had years remaining, tendered their resignations effective with the close of the meeting as was traditional. The membership had insisted on a larger role for elected delegates, and they constituted half of the body. Lefebvre's opponents were well organized, and when he tried to assume the chair, they insisted that the Chapter was a legislative body entitled to elect its own officers. On 11 September 1968 the Chapter supported that position on a vote of 63 to 40, and Lefebvre stopped attending. The Chapter then elected its leaders and proceeded with intense but respectful debate on the critical issue: the balance between the constraints of the order's religious life and the exercise of its missionary charge. Lefebvre returned on 28 September and addressed the issue in uncompromising language. He predicted any changes would lead to "a caricature of community life where anarchy, disorder, and individual initiative have free reign". His tone and arguments won him no support; the convention elected Fr. Joseph Lécuyer, a French theologian, his successor as superior general on 26 October.

Theological and political positions

Background 
Lefebvre belonged to an identifiable strand of right-wing political and religious opinion in French society that originated among the defeated royalists after the 1789 French Revolution. Lefebvre's political and theological outlook mirrored that of a significant number of conservative members of French society under the French Third Republic (1870–1940). The Third Republic was reft by conflicts between the secular Left and the Catholic Right, with many individuals on both sides espousing distinctly radical positions (see, for example, the article on the famous Dreyfus affair). Thus it has been said that "Lefebvre was... a man formed by the bitter hatreds that defined the battle lines in French society and culture from the French Revolution to the Vichy regime".

Lefebvre's first biographer, the English traditionalist writer Michael Davies, wrote in the first volume of his Apologia Pro Marcel Lefebvre:

In similar vein, the pro-SSPX English priest Michael Crowdy wrote, in his preface to his translation of Lefebvre's Open Letter to Confused Catholics:

Theological positions 
Lefebvre was associated with the following positions:
 The rejection of 'false' or 'aberrant' ecumenism in favour of Catholic exclusivism;
 The espousal of pragmatic religious tolerance instead of the principle of religious liberty;
 The rejection of collegiality within the church in favour of strict papal supremacy;
 Opposition to the replacement of the Tridentine Mass with the Mass of Paul VI.

Political positions 
Political positions espoused by Lefebvre included the following:
 Condemnation of the 1789 French Revolution and what he called its "Masonic and anti-Catholic principles".
 Support for the "Catholic order" of the authoritarian French Vichy government (1940–1944) of Marshal Philippe Pétain.
 Support for the National Front led by Jean-Marie Le Pen.
 Opposition to Muslim immigration into Europe. In 1990, Lefebvre was convicted in a French court and sentenced to pay a fine of 5,000 francs when he stated in this connection that "it is your wives, your daughters, your children who will be kidnapped and dragged off to a certain kind of places  as they exist in Casablanca".

Society of Saint Pius X

Lawful formation

After retiring from the post of Superior General of the Holy Ghost Fathers, Lefebvre was approached by traditionalists from the French Seminary in Rome who had been refused tonsure, the rite by which, until 1973, a seminarian became a cleric. They asked for a conservative seminary to complete their studies. After directing them to the University of Fribourg, Switzerland, Lefebvre was urged to teach these seminarians personally. In 1969, he received permission from the local bishop to establish a seminary in Fribourg which opened with nine students, moving to Écône, Switzerland in 1971. 

Lefebvre proposed to his seminarians the establishment of a society of priests without vows. In November 1970, Bishop François Charrière of Fribourg established, on a provisional (ad experimentum) basis for six years, the International Priestly Society of Saint Pius X (SSPX) as a "pious union".

Early opposition
In November 1972, the bishops of France, gathered as the Plenary Assembly of French Bishops at Lourdes, whose theological outlook was quite different from Lefebvre's, treated the then-legal Écône seminary with suspicion and referred to it as Séminaire sauvage or "Outlaw Seminary". They indicated that they would incardinate none of the seminarians. Cardinal Secretary of State Jean-Marie Villot accused Lefebvre before Pope Paul VI of making his seminarians sign a condemnation of the Pope, which Lefebvre vigorously denied.

Apostolic Visitors

In November 1974, two Belgian priests carried out a rigorous inspection on the instructions of a commission of cardinals, producing, it was said, a favourable report. In what he later described as a mood of "doubtlessly excessive indignation", On 21 November 1974, Lefebvre wrote a "Declaration" in which he attacked the modernist and liberal trends that he saw in the reforms being undertaken within the church at that time.

The Commission of Cardinals declared in reply that the declaration was "unacceptable on all points".

In January 1975, Bishop Pierre Mamie, who had succeeded Charrière in Fribourg in 1970, determined that the SSPX's status as a "pious union" should end. On 24 January 1975, he asked the prefect of the Sacred Congregation for Religious, Cardinal Arturo Tabera, to terminate its status as a "pious union".

On 13 February, Lefebvre was invited to Rome for a meeting with the commission of cardinals, which he described as "a close cross examination of the judicial type", regarding the contents of his "Declaration", followed by a second meeting on 3 March. In May, the commission announced it approved Mamie's plan. Lefebvre contended that canon law gave the pope alone the authority to suppress a religious congregation, and only by his direct decree.

Tabera responded in April expressing full agreement and telling Mamie to proceed himself, and Mamie suppressed the SSPX on 6 May 1975, effective immediately. This action was upheld by Pope Paul, who wrote to Lefebvre in June 1975. Lefebvre nevertheless continued his work citing legal advice from canon lawyers that the Society had not been "legally suppressed" and that the Society continued to enjoy the privilege of incardinating its own priests. Lefebvre also argued that there were insufficient grounds for suppression as the Apostolic Visitors, by the Commission's own admission, delivered a positive report, and that since his Declaration had not been condemned by the Congregation for the Doctrine of the Faith, he appealed, twice, to the appellate court of the church, the Apostolic Signatura. Lefebvre later wrote that Cardinal Villot blocked the move, and one of his supporters wrote that Villot threatened the Prefect of the Apostolic Signatura, Cardinal Dino Staffa, with dismissal if the appeals were not denied.

In 1976, Mamie warned Lefebvre that saying Mass though Catholic Church authorities had forbidden him from exercising his priestly functions would further exacerbate his relationship with Rome.

Disagreement with the Vatican 

During the consistory of 24 May 1976, Pope Paul VI criticized Lefebvre by name and appealed to him and his followers to change their minds.

On 29 June 1976, Lefebvre went ahead with planned priestly ordinations without the approval of the local bishop and despite receiving letters from Rome forbidding them. As a result Lefebvre was suspended a collatione ordinum, i.e., forbidden to ordain any priests. A week later, the Prefect of the Congregation for Bishops informed him that, to have his situation regularized, he needed to ask the pope's pardon. Lefebvre responded with a letter claiming that the modernization of the church was a "compromise with the ideas of modern man" originating in a secret agreement between high dignitaries in the church and senior Freemasons prior to the council. Lefebvre was then notified that, since he had not apologized to the pope, he was suspended a divinis, i.e., he could no longer legally administer any of the sacraments. Lefebvre remarked that he had been forbidden from celebrating the new rite of Mass. Pope Paul apparently took this seriously and stated that Lefebvre "thought he dodged the penalty by administering the sacraments using the previous formulas". In spite of his suspension, Lefebvre continued to celebrate Mass and to administer the other sacraments, including the conferral of Holy Orders to the students of his seminary.

Pope Paul received Lefebvre in audience on 11 September 1976, and one month later wrote to him admonishing him and repeating the appeal he had made at the audience. Pope John Paul II received Lefebvre in audience sixty days after his 1978 election, Lefebvre begged Pope John Paul II to allow him to do his work with the SSPX unsupervised, Pope John Paul II refused Lefebvre's request.

Écône consecrations 

In a 1987 sermon Lefebvre, his health failing at age 81, announced his intention to consecrate a bishop to carry on his work after his death. This despite the fact that under Catholic canon law the consecration of a bishop without the permission of the pope incurs excommunication: "A bishop who consecrates some one a bishop without a pontifical mandate and the person who receives the consecration from him incur a latae sententiae excommunication reserved to the Apostolic See.

During 1987 Lefebvre tried to reach an agreement with Cardinal Joseph Ratzinger, Prefect of the Congregation for the Doctrine of the Faith (later Pope Benedict XVI). However, on 4 September 1987, in Ecône, Lefebvre stated that the Vatican was in apostasy and that he would no longer collaborate with Ratzinger.

On 5 May 1988, Lefebvre signed an agreement with Ratzinger to regularize the situation of the Society of St Pius X. Ratzinger agreed that one bishop would be consecrated for the Society, to be approved by the pope.

Breaking of the agreement, consecrations 
Shortly after the agreement, however, Lefebvre announced that he had received a note from Ratzinger that asked him "to beg pardon for [his] errors", which he interpreted to mean that he would be made to accept the teachings of the Second Vatican Council and the "spirit of Assisi". Lefebvre referred to the alleged prophecy of Our Lady of La Salette that "Rome will lose the Faith" and declared himself obliged to consecrate a successor—if necessary, without papal approval. As the agreement did not specify a date for the episcopal consecration, should Lefebvre have died before it was granted, the Society would have been unable to ordain any seminarians and forced into submission to the Holy See.

Lefebvre dubbed his plan "Operation Survival".

Pope John Paul II appealed to him not to proceed in "a schismatic act", warning of "theological and canonical consequences".

On 30 June 1988, Lefebvre, with Bishop Emeritus Antônio de Castro Mayer of Campos, Brazil, as co-consecrator, consecrated four SSPX priests as bishops: Bernard Tissier de Mallerais, Richard Williamson, Alfonso de Galarreta and Bernard Fellay.

Shortly before the consecrations, Lefebvre gave the following sermon:
... this ceremony, which is apparently done against the will of Rome, is in no way a schism. We are not schismatics! If an excommunication was pronounced against the bishops of China, who separated themselves from Rome and put themselves under the Chinese government, one very easily understands why Pope Pius XII excommunicated them. There is no question of us separating ourselves from Rome, nor of putting ourselves under a foreign government, nor of establishing a sort of parallel church as the Bishops of Palmar de Troya have done in Spain. They have even elected a pope, formed a college of cardinals... It is out of the question for us to do such things. Far from us be this miserable thought to separate ourselves from Rome!

The next day, 1 July, the Congregation for Bishops issued a decree stating that this was a schismatic act and that all six direct participants had incurred automatic excommunication.

Aftermath 
On 2 July, Pope John Paul II condemned the consecration in his apostolic letter Ecclesia Dei, in which he stated that the consecration constituted a schismatic act and that the bishops and priests involved were automatically excommunicated:

Lefebvre responded by contradicting Pope John Paul II, saying that he and the other clerics involved had not "separated themselves from Rome" and were not schismatic. He invoked canon 1323 of the 1983 Code of Canon Law that they "found themselves in a case of necessity", not having succeeded, as they said, in making "Rome" understand that "this change which has occurred in the Church" since the Second Vatican Council was "not Catholic". In a letter addressed to the four priests he was about to consecrate as bishops, Lefebvre wrote: "I do not think one can say that Rome has not lost the Faith."

On 18 July, twelve priests and some seminarians led by Josef Bisig left the SSPX because of the Ecône consecrations. Bisig became the first superior general of the newly formed Priestly Fraternity of St. Peter, a group that reached an agreement with the Holy See.

Death 
Lefebvre died from cancer on 25 March 1991 at the age of 85 in Martigny, Switzerland. Eight days later he was buried in the crypt at the society's international seminary in Écône. Archbishop Edoardo Rovida, Apostolic Nuncio to Switzerland, and Bishop Henri Schwery of Sion, the local diocese, came and prayed at his body.

Legacy of the 1988 consecrations

Lifting of excommunications 

On 10 March 2009, at the request of the four surviving bishops, Pope Benedict lifted their excommunications. In a letter to the bishops of the entire Church, Benedict offered this clarification:

Episcopal lineage 
The lineage originated by the 1988 consecrations amounts to 9 bishops as of 2019, out of whom 8 are alive:
 Bp Alfonso Ruiz de Galarreta
 Bp Licinio Rangel (consecrated by Bp Bernard Tissier de Mallerais – plus Bp Alfonso Ruiz de Galarreta operating as a consecrator)
 Bp Bernard Fellay
 Bp Bernard Tissier de Mallerais
 Bp Licinio Rangel (+)
 Bp Fernando Arêas Rifan (consecrated by Cdl Dario Castrillon Hoyos – plus Bp Licinio Rangel operating as a consecrator)
 Bp Richard Nelson Williamson
 Bp Licinio Rangel (consecrated by Bp Bernard Tissier de Mallerais – plus Bp Richard Nelson Williamson operating as a consecrator)
 Bp Jean-Michel Faure
 Bp Dom Tomás de Aquino Ferreira da Costa (consecrated Bp Richard Nelson Williamson – plus Bp Jean-Michel Faure operating as a consecrator)
 Bp Gerardo Zendejas (consecrated Bp Richard Nelson Williamson – plus Bp Jean-Michel Faure & Bp Dom Tomás de Aquino Ferreira da Costa operating as consecrators)

Decorations and awards 
During his career, Lefebvre was decorated by several governments, including:
 France: Legion of Honor
 Gabon: Equatorial Star of Gabon
 Senegal: Grand National Order of Senegal

Works 
 
 
  Translated from the original book:

See also 
 Marcel Lefebvre – Archbishop in Stormy Times, 2012 documentary film based on the biography by Bishop Bernard Tissier de Mallerais

Notes

References 
Citations

Sources 

General
 
 
 
 
 
 
 
 
 
 
 
 
Publications of the Society of Saint Pius X
  Also partially available from the official website of the Society of Saint Pius XI .
 
 
 
 
 
 
  The official biography of Lefebvre, originally published in French (Clovis, 2002).
 
Publications of the Holy See
  First English translation of the 1983 "Codex Iuris Canonici" published by the Libreria Editrice Vaticana.

External links 

 Archbishop Lefebvre, published by the SSPX

1905 births
1991 deaths
People from Tourcoing
Antisemitism in France
Holy Ghost Fathers
Roman Catholic missionaries in Gabon
French Roman Catholic archbishops
French Roman Catholic titular bishops
Roman Catholic titular archbishops
French Roman Catholic bishops in Africa
20th-century Roman Catholic archbishops in Africa
Coetus Internationalis Patrum
Participants in the Second Vatican Council
People excommunicated by the Catholic Church
French traditionalist Catholics
Members of the Society of Saint Pius X
Traditionalist Catholic bishops
Traditionalist Catholic writers
French anti-communists
Dissident Roman Catholic theologians
French Roman Catholic missionaries
Anti-Masonry
Écône consecrations
Pontifical French Seminary alumni
Roman Catholic bishops of Dakar